The following is a list of the number-one music videos of 2017 on the weekly Billboard China V Chart. The chart ranks weekly most viewed music videos using data from Chinese video-sharing site YinYueTai (YYT).

Chart history

References 

YinYueTai
China V Chart
China V Chart
Chinese music industry
V Chart 2017
China V Chart Videos 2017